Stan Van Tricht (born 20 September 1999) is a Belgian cyclist, who currently rides for UCI WorldTeam .

While riding as a stagiaire for Deceuninck–Quick-Step, he won the 2021 Gullegem Koerse.

Major results

2016
 8th Grand Prix Bob Jungels
2017
 2nd Overall Keizer der Juniores
 4th Overall Oberosterreich Juniorenrundfahrt
2019
 3rd Overall Olympia's Tour
1st Stage 2
 10th Liège–Bastogne–Liège U23
 10th Ronde van Vlaanderen Beloften
2020
 1st Stage 3 Arden Challenge
2021
 1st Gullegem Koerse
 1st Circuit de Valkenswaard
 2nd Coppa della Pace
 3rd Overall International Tour of Rhodes
1st Young rider classification
 3rd International Rhodes Grand Prix
 7th Ronde van Limburg
 7th Circuit de Wallonie
2022
 4th Dwars door het Hageland

References

External links

1999 births
Living people
Belgian male cyclists
Sportspeople from Leuven
Cyclists from Flemish Brabant